Konta  is a tehsil headquarters in India

Konta may also refer to:

Places
 Konta special woreda 
 Konta, Iran

People
 Johanna Konta (born 1991),  British tennis player

Music
 Pio Konta (Greek: Πιο κοντά; English: Even Closer), second album released by Greek singer Kostas Martakis